Milan Bruncvik (born 21 June 1984 in Litoměřice) is a Czech rower. He finished 5th in the men's coxless four at the 2008 Summer Olympics and 13th in the same event in 2012. He was the first Czech to participate in The Boat Race.

References 

 
 

1984 births
Living people
Czech male rowers
Olympic rowers of the Czech Republic
Rowers at the 2008 Summer Olympics
Rowers at the 2012 Summer Olympics
Cambridge University Boat Club rowers
European Rowing Championships medalists
People from Litoměřice
Sportspeople from the Ústí nad Labem Region